The Turkish Basketball Second League, also called TB2L, is the third-tier level league of professional club basketball in Turkey. The league was previously called the Turkish Basketball Third League (TB3L).

Format and promotion and relegation
There are a total of 15 teams participating in the league for the TB2L 2019–20 season. Each team plays each other in their group twice during the regular season. The top 8 teams from each group qualify to an elimination round (best of 3 games). Winners in elimination games qualify to the Quarterfinals (best of 3 games). Winners in the quarterfinals qualify to a final group (round robin). The top two teams in the final group are promoted to the second-tier level Turkish Basketball First League (TBL) for the next season.

Seasons

Current clubs (2022–23 season)

References

External links
Official site 
Eurobasket.com League Profile

 
League 3
Turk
Professional sports leagues in Turkey